Swallowtail butterflies are large, colorful butterflies in the family Papilionidae, and include over 550 species. Though the majority are tropical, members of the family inhabit every continent except Antarctica. The family includes the largest butterflies in the world, the birdwing butterflies of the genus Ornithoptera.

Swallowtails have a number of distinctive features; for example, the papilionid caterpillar bears a repugnatorial organ called the osmeterium on its prothorax. The osmeterium normally remains hidden, but when threatened, the larva turns it outward through a transverse dorsal groove by inflating it with fluid.

The forked appearance in some of the swallowtails' hindwings, which can be seen when the butterfly is resting with its wings spread, gave rise to the common name swallowtail. As for its formal name, Linnaeus chose Papilio for the type genus, as papilio is Latin for "butterfly". For the specific epithets of the genus, Linnaeus applied the names of Greek figures to the swallowtails. The type species: Papilio machaon honored Machaon, one of the sons of Asclepius, mentioned in the Iliad. Further, the species Papilio homerus is named after the Greek poet, Homer.

The Mon of the Taira clan of Japan is an Agehachō (swallowtail butterfly).

Taxonomy

Subfamilies 

The genera of extant swallowtails are usually classified into three subfamilies, Baroniinae, Parnassiinae, and Papilioninae, the latter two being further divided into tribes. In swallowtails, besides morphological characteristics, the choice of food plants and ecological lifestyle reflect phylogeny and classification.

Baroniinae 
The Baroniinae are a monotypic subfamily, restricted to a very small region in Mexico and are considered to be the most basal of the subfamilies. Baronia brevicornis is considered to be a relict species, and shares features with a fossil taxon Pra Papilio. Baronia is unique among papilionidae' as having an Acacia species (family Leguminosae) as its food plant.

Subfamily: Baroniene.

Parnassiinae 
The Parnassiinae are a subfamily of essentially Holarctic butterflies. The vast majority of species, mostly Parnassius, can be found in mountain habitats. Parnassiinines can also be found in other habitats such as "arid deserts (Hypermnestra), humid forests (Luehdorfia) and even lowland meadows (Zerynthia)". The tribes recognized in the Parnassiinae are Parnassiini, Zerynthiini, and Luehdorfiini.

Tribe Parnassiini contains two genera, Hypermnestra, largely confined to central Asia and the genus Parnassius (the Apollos), a distinctive group of many species, all of which are alpine and capable of living at high altitudes. Most Parnassius have two small reddish spots on their hindwings. The tribe Luehdorfiini contains the genera Archon of Asia minor and the genus Luehdorfia of China and Japan. These two tribes have evolved to change their food plants, while the third tribe, Zerynthiini, has retained the archetypical papilionid food plant, the lowland vine Aristolochia. Zerynthiini comprises four genera – Sericinus, Bhutanitis, Zerynthia and Allancastria.

Subfamily: Parnassiinae.

Papilioninae 
The tribes recognized in the Papilioninae are Leptocircini, Teinopalpini, Troidini, and Papilionini.

Subfamily: Papilioninae.

Praepapilioninae 
An additional subfamily, Praepapilioninae, consisting of a single genus Praepapilio, includes two species of extinct butterflies, each member being described from single fossils found in a middle Eocene deposit in Colorado, United States (Durden and Rose, 1978).

Phylogeny 
A phylogeny of the Papilionidae based on Nazari (2007) is given:

It is now accepted that the subfamily Papilioninae is monophyletic. The swallowtail butterflies in the nominate tribe Papilionini number about 225 species and studies have been made on their host plant coevolution and phylogeny. Old morphological classifications were also found to be valid in that they formed clusters. Species belonging to the groups that use Rutaceae as host plants formed two groups corresponding to Old World and American taxa. Those that fed on Lauraceae and Magnoliaceae were found to form another cluster which includes both Asian and American taxa.

The Parnassinae, like the Papilioninae, were also believed to be monophyletic based on morphological studies but recent studies based on both morphological and molecular characteristics suggest that this is not the case. Of the Parnassiinae, the genera Parnassius and Hypermnestra were found to be extremely close based on molecular studies and are now considered to be part of the tribe Parnassiini. The two taxa, Archon and Luehdorfia, have been found to be closely related through analysis of nuclear and mitochondrial DNA, and, though they share no morphological similarities, have now been united in the tribe Luehdorfiini.

The subfamily Baroniinae is represented by the sole representative species Baronia brevicornis. They are unique in the family to use the Fabaceae (Leguminosae) as their larval host plants. The Baronninae and the extinct subfamily Praepapilioninae share many external similarities and are traditionally considered to be the most primitive subfamilies and sister to the rest of the swallowtails. Recent research suggests that this may not be the case, the Baroniinae being closely related to only the Parnassiinae, and Praepapilio to only the Papilionini and neither taxa being sister to the rest of the swallowtails.

Distribution 
As of 2005, 552 extant species have been identified which are distributed across the tropical and temperate regions. Various species inhabit altitudes ranging from sea level to high mountains, as in the case of most species of Parnassius. The majority of swallowtail species and the greatest diversity are found in the tropics and subtropical regions between 20°N and 20°S, particularly Southeast Asia, and between 20°N and 40°N in East Asia. Only 12 species are found in Europe and only one species, Papilio machaon is found in the British Isles. North America has 40 species, including several tropical species and Parnassius.

The northernmost swallowtail is the Siberian Apollo (Parnassius arcticus), found in the Arctic Circle in northeastern Yakutia, at altitudes of 1500 meters above sea level. In the Himalayas, various Apollo species such as Parnassius epaphus, have been found at altitudes of 6,000 meters above sea level.

Food 

The caterpillars of various swallowtail butterfly species feed on a wide range of different plants, most depending on only one of five families: Aristolochiaceae, Annonaceae, Lauraceae, Umbelliferae (Apiaceae) and Rutaceae. By eating some of these toxic plants, the caterpillars sequester aristolochic acid which renders both the caterpillars and the butterflies of some of these as toxic, thus protecting them from predators. Similarly, the Parnassius smintheus sequesters sarmentosin from its host plant Sedum lanceolatum for protection from predators. Swallowtail tribes Zerynthiini (Parnassiinae), Luehdorfiini (Parnassiinae) and Troidini (Papilioninae), almost exclusively use the family Aristolochiaceae as their host plants.

For example, the eastern black swallowtail's (Papilio polyxenes) main host plant in the wild is Queen Anne's lace, but they also eat garden plants in the carrot family, including carrots, parsley, dill, and fennel.

Adult swallowtails sip nectar, but also mud and sometimes manure.

Life cycle 
The detailed descriptions of morphological characteristics of the Papilionidae, as quoted in Bingham (1905) are as follows:

Stages of development of a papilionid, the giant swallowtail (Papilio cresphontes)

Distinguishing characteristics 
The key characteristics that differentiate the Papilionidae from the other butterfly families are:
 The osmeterium is a forked, fleshy eversible organ found in the prothoracic segment of caterpillars.
 Venation – in swallowtails, the second anal vein, 2A, extends up to the wing margin and does not link with the first anal vein, 1A. These veins are fused in other butterfly families and 2A does not reach the wing margin.
 The sclerites of the cervix (membranous neck between the head and thorax) are fused beneath the neck where the muscles for head movement are anchored.

Special adaptations and defense 
Swallowtail butterflies practice Batesian mimicry, a behavior in which the butterflies' appearance closely resemble that of distasteful species that prevents predation. Swallowtails differ from many animals that practice mimicry. The tiger swallowtail butterfly (Papilio glaucus), exhibits a female-limited polymorphism for Batesian mimicry and others, such as the Canadian tiger swallowtail (Papilio canadensis) do not display any form of mimicry.

Predators include the red-winged blackbird, Pennsylvania firefly, five-lined skink, green darner, goldenrod spider, Chinese mantis, fiery searcher, and striped skunk.

Biological basis for polymorphisms in mimicry 
Not all individuals in some species are identical in appearance. For example, Papilio glaucus (eastern tiger swallowtail), Y-linkage determines whether the females are either wild-type (yellow and black) or melanic (dark melanin replaces the yellow background). This genetic difference stems from the fact that melanism is controlled by a single gene, which controls the level of dopamine in the organism. The enzyme BAS, which assists dopamine in producing the yellow pigmentation, normally found on the wings' background, is suppressed. Without the pigmentation, the butterfly appears mostly black (the melanic form) and is a Batesian mimic of Battus philenor, the pipevine swallowtail. There are also Papilio glaucus that are not wholly black; several possess an intermediate "sooty" color and are sensitive to temperature.

The different polymorphisms (wild-type, melanic, and the 'sooty' intermediate) depend upon the geographical distribution and abundance of its mimic, the Battus philenor, whose wing color varies depending on its geographical location. In order to be successfully confused for the B. philenor by predators, the Papilio glaucus's background wing color matches that of the B. philenor residing in the same regional area. Studies support this theory; in the southeastern United States, the relative abundance of melanic females has been found to geographically correlate with B. philenor.

Mimicry 
Only certain subsets of swallowtails practice mimicry. Species differ in whether one or both sexes is mimetic, and whether the mimicry is monomorphic or polymorphic. A phenomenon which has received particular attention is female-limited polymorphism, in which only the females of a species are mimetic and polymorphic, often mimicking different, distantly-related aposematic butterflies. This polymorphism is seen in Papilio dardanus, the African swallowtail butterfly, whose females have three different morphs for wing color pattern: a black-and-white pattern for Batesian mimicry, a black-and-yellow pattern that resembles the males of the species, and a pattern with orange patches that resembles the elderly males of the species. Given that the males of the species, which do not have Batesian mimicry, are preyed upon much more frequently by predators than the females, an ongoing question is why females would exhibit the non-mimetic wing pattern, which would seemingly lower their fitness compared to the mimicry form. The pipevine swallowtail exhibits Batesian mimicry as well.

Several hypotheses for this phenomenon were made, the two noteworthy being the pseudosexual selection hypothesis and the male avoidance hypothesis. In the pseudosexual hypothesis, male butterflies aggressively approached the male-looking females and then mellowed their behavior into sexual behavior when they were close enough to identify them as females. In the male avoidance hypothesis, female butterflies disguise themselves in an attempt to evade male harassment, as courtship can be harmful, time-consuming, and attract predators.

One study recorded male responses to females of each morphs and found that the males consistently favored the Batesian mimics, then the black and yellow, and then the morph with orange patches. The scientists concluded that frequency-dependent selection did lead to equal success for all three alternative strategies: the Batesian females suffered the fewest predators but their fitness was reduced the most by sexual harassment, while the other two faced lower sexual harassment but also lost fitness from predators' attacks.

Mating and young 
After mating, the male Parnassines produce a glue-like substance that is used to seal the female genital opening and prevent other males from mating. They lay individual eggs on the underside of the leaves of their food plants. There is no parental investment once the eggs have been laid.

The pupae are typically attached to the substrate by the cremaster but with head up held by a silk girdle. The Apollos, however, pupate in debris on the ground and also build a loose cocoon. In the temperate regions, the winters are passed in a pupal diapause stage.

In culture 
Since swallowtail butterflies are large, colorful, and attractive, they have been targeted by butterfly collectors. The largest of these, the birdwing butterflies are particularly sought after and are cultured in butterfly farms to supply collectors.

Many members of the family, as larvae, feed on plants of the citrus family Rutaceae, making some of these attractive butterflies pests in citrus orchards.

The Oregon swallowtail is the state insect of Oregon. The eastern tiger swallowtail is the state insect of Virginia and the state butterfly of Georgia, Delaware, and South Carolina. The black swallowtail is the state butterfly of Oklahoma.

References

Further reading 
 Chattopadhyay, J. (2007). Swallowtail Butterflies, Biology & Ecology of a few Indian Species. Desh Prashan, Kolkata, India. – 134 pp. .
 Glassberg, J. (2001). Butterflies through Binoculars. The West.
 Guppy, C.S. and Shepard, J.H. (2001). Butterflies of British Columbia.
 Igarashi, S. (1979). Papilionidae and their early stages [in Japanese]. 2 vols. – Tokyo, Kodansha, 218 pp., 357 pls.
 James, D.G. & Nunnallee, D. (2011). Life Histories of Cascadia Butterflies.
 Korolev V.A. (2014). Cataloges on the collection of Lepidoptera. Part II. Papilionidae. – Moscow, 387 p., 20 color tabs,  
 Pelham, J. (2008). Catalogue of the Butterflies of the United States and Canada.
 Pyle, R.M. (2002). The Butterflies of Cascadia.
 Rothschild, L.W. (1895). A revision of the Papilios of the Eastern Hemisphere, exclusive of Africa. Novitates Zoologicae 2(3):167–463 and plates pdf
Rothschild, W. and Jordan, K. (1906). A revision of the American Papilios. Novitates Zoologicae 13: 411–752. online (and as pdf) (Facsimile edition ed. P.H. Arnaud, 1967).
 Seitz, A. (1907). 1. Gattung Papilio, Schwalbenschwänze. In: Seitz, A. (ed). Die Groß-Schmetterlinger der Erde. I. Abteilung (Die Großschmetterlinge des Palaeakrtischen Faunengebietes). 1. Band: Tagfalter. pp. 8–15. F. Lehmann, Stuttgart.
 Talbot, G. (1939). The Fauna of British India. Butterflies. Volume 1. Papilionidae and Pieridae. Taylor & Francis, London; xxix, 600 pp., 3 pls, 1 map.
 Tuzov V., Bogdanov P., Devyatkin A., Kaabak L., Korolev V., Murzin V., Samodurov G., Tarassov E. (1997). Guide to the butterflies of Russia and adjacent territories (Lepidoptera, Rhopalocera). Vol. 1. Sofia-Moscow: Pensoft-Press, 480 p., 79 col. plates.
 Warren, A.D., Davis, K.J., Grishin, N.V., Pelham, J.P., Stangeland, E.M. (2012). Interactive Listing of American Butterflies.

External links 

 "Papilionidae" on Tree of Life  web project.

 Revised GloBIS/GART Papilionidae species checklist.
 GloBIS Database Includes type images
 Natural History Museum, London web site on "Afrotropical Kite Swallowtails".
 
 Photoset and description of lesser known species of swallowtails
 Swallowtails Papilionidae of the World: a pictorial summary. Comprehensive.

 
Papilionoidea
Articles containing video clips